Gideon's Way is a British television crime series made by ITC Entertainment and broadcast by ITV in 1964–1966, based on novels by John Creasey (writing as 'J. J. Marric'). The series was made at Elstree Studios in twin production with The Saint television series, which was likewise produced by Robert S. Baker and Monty Berman. The show did not acknowledge any help from Scotland Yard or any other police force or advisor.

Synopsis 
Daphne Anderson starred as Gideon's wife, Kate; their three children were played by Giles Watling as younger son Malcolm, Richard James as elder son Matthew (who seemed to have a lot of new girlfriends), and Andrea Allan as daughter Pru. Unusually for police stories, Gideon was shown as a family man at home—though urgent phone calls from his bosses tend to disrupt family plans too often. However, he did admit in "State Visit" that his wife had walked out on him for a while years ago, when he put the job first and her second. They live in an expensive detached house in Tufnell Park.

Cast
The series stars John Gregson in the title role as Commander George Gideon of Scotland Yard, with Alexander Davion as his assistant, Detective Chief Inspector David Keen, Reginald Jessup as Det. Superintendent LeMaitre (nicknamed Lemmy), Ian Rossiter as Detective Chief Superintendent Joe Bell and Basil Dignam as Commissioner Scott-Marle.

Guest stars
Many well-known British actors appear in guest roles, including Patrick Allen, Keith Baxter, George Cole, Harry Fowler, Gordon Jackson, Ronald Lacey, Anton Rodgers, Rosemary Leach, Gerald Harper, Victor Maddern, Richard Carpenter and John Hurt. There was an early role for Donald Sutherland in the episode "The Millionaire's Daughter". Several actors, including Mike Pratt, Angela Douglas, Jean Marsh and Kay Walsh, appear twice in the series, cast in different roles.

Production
There was extensive location shooting in mid-1960s London, with fast-paced action and strong story lines, which made the series very popular in its day. The show was broadcast in the United States under the title Gideon CID. There were different starting titles for the American series, showing incidents of violent crime while the British titles just introduced the main characters. The theme music was composed by Edwin Astley. In scoring the incidental music, Astley re-used some of the cues from The Saint on which he was also working; in turn, he re-purposed material composed for this series in The Baron, which followed a year later.

Episodes
Episodes were filmed between June 1964 and May 1965, on location and at Elstree Studios. Fifteen episodes (#101 – #115 below) were filmed by December 1964, after which the cast and crew were allowed a week's break before filming on the second batch of eleven episodes (#116 – #126 below) began on 11 January 1965.

Airdate is for ATV Midlands. ITV regions varied date and order. The first transmission was on ATV London on 17 October 1964 (The V Men).

Broadcasters

United Kingdom
The series began a repeat run in October 2019 at 9pm on Talking Pictures TV. This revival ended on 18 February 2020 with "The Nightlifers" including an onscreen tribute to guest star Derek Fowlds who died in January 2020. The series was shown again on the channel in Spring 2021, and in April 2022.

Australia
The Australian rights are held by the Nine Network who, over many decades, have shown numerous repeats in non-peak viewing times. From 2012 to 2019, there were numerous showings in the early hours of the morning on Gem, a Nine Network digital outlet, sometimes twice per morning. The Gideon's Way repeats alternate with re-screenings of another British series Danger Man, and of the Canadian program Seaway.

DVD
All 26 episodes of this classic 1960s British crime thriller series was released on Region 2 DVD by Network Distributing in August 2005.

References

External links
 John Creasey brand owner Owatonna Media
 

1960s British crime television series
Television shows shot at Associated British Studios
Television series by ITC Entertainment
ITV television dramas
John Creasey characters
Television shows based on British novels
British detective television series
1960s British drama television series
1966 British television series endings
1965 British television series debuts
Black-and-white British television shows
English-language television shows
Cultural depictions of Metropolitan Police officers